Ramu is a 1968 Indian Telugu-language drama film produced by AVM Productions and directed by A. C. Tirulokchandar. The film stars N. T. Rama Rao and Jamuna, with music composed by R. Govardhanam. It is a remake of the Hindi film Door Gagan Ki Chhaon Mein (1964), which was first remade as the Tamil film of the same name (1966). The film was a silver jubilee hit.

Plot 
Ramu is a proactive boy, who leads a happy life with his father Raja, and mother Seeta. Raja works as a soldier, once he gets an emergency call, hence he rushes to the war field. During that time, dacoits attack their village and put fire to Ramu's house his mother is burnt alive, looking at it, Ramu becomes dumb. After that, their neighbor Chinnayya takes care of Ramu and waits for Raja's arrival. Raja returns and goes into shock knowing the facts, takes an oath to get back his son's voice and they leave the village.

Parallelly, in another village, Lakshmi (Jamuna) daughter of Sipayi Singanna, a wealthy woman whose property is under the guardianship of her maternal uncle Ganganna. Ganganna has two sons Ranganna as crooked as his father and Venkanna a kind-hearted person. Ganganna wants to grab Lakshmi's property by performing her marriage with Ranganna. But Lakshmi gets back her property through the court. Due to this, Ganganna develops a grudge against her.

On their way back, Ramu and Raja are passing through the village where Ranganna beats Ramu for obstructing when the quarrel arises between Raja and Ranganna. Ranganna back-stabs Raja and he faints, Lakshmi spots them, takes them along with her, and requests Raja to stay in her house until he recovers. Days pass on, and Ramu gets closer to Lakshmi, she also takes care of him as her son and loves Raja.

Meanwhile, Ganganna makes no one work in Lakshmi's fields when Raja comes forward and completes the farming. Eventually, once Ramu visits a burial ground where he meets a madman Gopalam, whose daughter has been cheated on by Ganganna. Both Gopalam and Ramu become good friends. Frustrated, Ranganna kidnaps Ramu and keeps him in his custody. Lakshmi, in search of Ramu, reaches there when Ranganna tries to molest her, Venkanna informs Raja and he too lands. In that quarrel, fire erupts and Lakshmi is stuck in it. Due to this incident, Ramu gets back his voice and saves her. Gopalam recognizes Ganganna, kills him, and gets arrested. The film ends with the marriage of Raja and Lakshmi.

Cast 
N. T. Rama Rao as Raja
Jamuna as Lakshmi
S. V. Ranga Rao as Gopalam
V. Nagayya as Swamiji
Relangi as Ganganna
Ramana Reddy as Armugam
Rajanala as Ranganna
Satyanarayana as Puli
Padmanabham as Venkanna
Allu Ramalingaiah as Lawyer
Master Rajkumar as Ramu
S. V. Ramadas as Sipayi Singanna
Perumallu as Chinnayya
Suryakantham as Manikyam
Geetanjali as Ratnam
Pushpalatha as Seeta

Music 
Music was composed by R. Govardhanam.

Release and reception 
Ramu was released on 4 May 1968. The film had a 100-day run 15 centers. running for 181 days at Durga Kala Mandir, Vijayawada, and becoming a silver jubilee hit.

References

Bibliography

External links 

 

1960s Telugu-language films
1968 drama films
1968 films
Films directed by A. C. Tirulokchandar
Indian drama films
Telugu remakes of Hindi films
Telugu remakes of Tamil films